Sarah Rayner is a British author who grew up in Richmond. She lives in Brighton and worked as an advertising copywriter before writing fiction full-time.

Rayner's break-out novel was her third, One Moment, One Morning, about a death on a train and the effect it has on three women.

Books

Fiction
The Other Half, Orion Publishing Group, 2001 (Revised edition 2013 by Picador) 
Getting Even, Orion Publishing Group, 2002 (Revised edition 2013 by Picador) 
One Moment, One Morning, Picador, 2010 (US publication 2011 by St. Martin's Press)
The Two Week Wait, Picador, 2012 (US Publication 2012 by St. Martin's Press)
Another Night, Another Day, Picador, 2014 (US Publication 2014 by St. Martin's Press)

Nonfiction
Making Friends with Anxiety, self-published e-book, 2014

External links
The Creative Pumpkin: Official Website of Sarah Rayner

References

Year of birth missing (living people)
Living people
Women's fiction
British chick lit writers
British women novelists
21st-century British novelists
21st-century British women writers